Vgethi (Greek: Βγέθι) or Viethi (Greek: Βιέθι) or Pefko (Greek: Πεύκο) or Pefka (Greek: Πεύκα) is a seaside town in East Attica, Greece. Since the 2011 local government reform it is part of the municipality Lavreotiki. Vgethi is a quite place only with scattered little houses and a beach which is visited, not only by the residents, but other people from the city and the suburbs too. It is located near Keratea from the North and to the South it is connected with Lavrio. It can be reached from the city through Lavriou Street.

References

Populated places in East Attica